Anil Kumble (born 17 October 1970) is a former Indian cricket captain, coach and commentator who played Test and One Day International cricket for his national team over an international career of 18 years. Widely regarded as one of the best leg spin bowlers in Test Cricket History, he took 619 wickets in Test cricket and is the fourth highest wicket taker of all time as of 2022. In 1999 while playing against Pakistan, Kumble dismissed all ten batsmen in a Test match innings, joining England's Jim Laker as the second player to achieve the feat. Unlike his contemporaries, Kumble was not a big turner of the ball, but relied primarily on pace, bounce, and accuracy. He was nicknamed "Apple"  and "Jumbo". Kumble was selected as the Cricketer of the Year in 1993 Indian Cricket, and one of the Wisden Cricketers of the Year three years later.

Born in Bangalore, Karnataka, Kumble developed an early interest in cricket as he grew up watching players like B. S. Chandrasekhar before becoming a full-fledged cricketer. He made his First-class debut at the age of 19 while representing Karnataka. Soon he was picked up for the Austral-Asia Cup in 1990 before making his Test debut against England later that year. Since then he has represented the Indian Test team on more than 132 Test matches and was responsible for many of India's victories. Kumble became a part of the regular ODI team during the early 1990s and held some of the best performances during this time; which included his six for 12 (six wickets for 12 runs) against the West Indies. The year 1996 proved to very successful for him as he was selected for the World Cup and emerged as the most successful bowler of the tournament; he played seven matches and captured 15 wickets at an average of 18.73.

Kumble was awarded the Padma Shri, India's fourth-highest civilian honour in 2005. After having played for 18 years, he announced his retirement from international cricket in November 2008. In October 2012, Kumble was appointed the chairman of the International Cricket Council (ICC)'s cricket committee.

Between 2012 and 2015, Kumble held positions as a chief mentor for the teams Royal Challengers Bangalore and Mumbai Indians in the Indian Premier League. He was also a former head coach of the Indian cricket team as well. In February 2015, he became the fourth Indian cricketer to be inducted into ICC Hall of Fame. Kumble is currently the Head Coach and the Director of Cricket Operations of Punjab Kings.

Personal life

Kumble was born to family in Bangalore, Karnataka to Krishna Swamy and Saroja who both hail from Kumbla near Kasaragod, Kerala. Kumble has a brother named Diinesh Kumble. He is married to Chetana Kumble, and has three children – son Mayas Kumble and daughters Aaruni and Svasti Kumble. His mother tongue is Kannada.

Kumble did his primary schooling in Holy Saint English School and he completed his Class X from National High School Basavanagudi. He began playing cricket on the streets of Bangalore and joined a club called "Young Cricketers" at the age of 13. After his high school he completed his Class XII from National Pre-University College Basavanagudi. Kumble later graduated from Rashtreeya Vidyalaya College of Engineering (RVCE) in B.E Mechanical Engineering in 1991–92. He is nicknamed "Jumbo" not only because his deliveries, for a spinner, are "as fast as a jumbo jet", but also because his feet are quite big or "Jumbo" as observed by his teammates. Kumble is a vegetarian.

Career

Early domestic career and international debut

Kumble made his first-class debut for Karnataka against Hyderabad on 30 November 1989, taking 4 wickets and bagging a pair. He was then selected for India Under-19s against Pakistan Under-19s, scoring 113 in the first test and 76 in the second. He made his ODI debut against Sri Lanka at Sharjah in the Austral-Asia Cup on 25 April 1990. He played one more game in the series against Pakistan and ended up picking two wickets. His Test debut came in the same year when India toured England for a three-test series. It was the second test of the series played at Manchester and he picked up 3 wickets conceding 105 runs in the first innings and went wicket-less in the second innings of the match which resulted in a draw. He did not play any Tests until 1992. Kumble picked up 13/138 in Irani Trophy against Delhi for Rest of India which ensured the latter's victory. This performance helped him earn a place in the Indian side that toured South Africa and Zimbabwe. It was during the 1992 Indian tour of South Africa that he established himself as a quality spinner, taking eight wickets in the second Test. All in all he took 18 wickets at an average of 25.94 and with an economy rate of 1.84 in the four-test series. Later that year, when England toured India, Kumble took 21 wickets in three Tests at an average of 19.8. He picked up seven wickets for 165 runs in the third Test of the series played at Bombay as India went on to win the match by an innings and 15 runs. He was adjudged man of the match for his performance.

Kumble took his first 50 Test wickets in 10 matches; the record remained the fastest by an Indian bowler until Ravichandran Ashwin surpassed him achieving the feat in nine matches. His 100 Test wickets in 21 Test matches, the second fastest by an Indian bowler after Erapalli Prasanna (who took 100 wickets in 20 matches). On 27 November 1993, he took six wickets for 12 runs in an ODI against the West Indies at Eden Gardens, Calcutta in the final of the Hero Cup, which was an Indian record for very long time. This record was broken by Stuart Binny on 17 June 2014 against Bangladesh. In January 1994, when Sri Lanka toured India, Kumble picked up his first 10 wicket haul in his 14th match which ensured India's victory by an innings and 119 runs. He picked up 11 wickets for 128 runs in the match.

In 1995 English cricket season Kumble played for Northamptonshire and was the leading wicket taker with 105 wickets at the average of 20.40. He was the only bowler to take more than 100 wickets during that season. His best performance came against Hampshire in a drawn match in County Championship, picking up 13 wickets for 192 runs. This performance in the English county cricket was noted by Wisden as they named him one of their five Cricketers of the Year in 1996.

1996 World Cup

The year 1996 proved to be extremely successful for Kumble as he claimed 61 ODI wickets at an average of 20.24. All in all, he was the leading wicket-taker in the calendar year with 90 wickets at an average of 24.14 in Tests and ODIs combined. Kumble was selected in the Indian side for the 1996 World Cup. He was a part of all the seven matches that India played.  Kumble was the leading wicket-taker in the tournament with 15 wickets at an average of 18.73. India played their first match against Kenya where Kumble took three for 28 runs, which helped to restrict Kenya for just 199/6 in their 50 overs. India won the match comfortably by seven wickets. In the subsequent matches he picked up three for 35 runs (against West Indies) and two wickets for 39 runs (against Sri Lanka) in group phase.

India played against Pakistan in the quarter-final phase. Kumble picked up 3 for 48 in the match which India eventually won. In the semi-final they subsequently lost to Sri Lanka in which Kumble's performance was 1 for 51.

Setting records and rise through the ranks

In October 1996, Anil Kumble along with Javagal Srinath helped India to win a scintillating ODI match against Australia in Bangalore in Titan Cup. The duo added 52 runs for 9th wicket partnership, after Sachin Tendulkar got out at 88 when India was 164/8, chasing a target of 216 runs. India eventually went on to win the Titan Cup. In February 1997 India visited the West Indies for a series of five tests and four ODIs. Kumble was part of the squad and he was the leading wicket-taker in the Test series. He picked up 19 wickets, averaging 30.31 with the ball. Kumble was the leading wicket-taker by a large margin when Australia visited India for Border-Gavaskar Trophy in 1998. He picked up 23 wickets in 3 test matches at the average of 18.26.

Kumble is one of three bowlers ever (the other two being Jim Laker of England in 1956 and Ajaz Patel of New Zealand in 2021) to have taken all ten wickets in a Test innings, taking 10 for 74. Kumble achieved this against Pakistan in the second Test played in Delhi in February 1999. Although by failing to dismiss Pakistan's Waqar Younis in either innings, he missed out on the achievement of dismissing all eleven batsmen in a Test match. It has been said that once he had got nine wickets his friend and teammate Javagal Srinath started bowling wide outside the off stump, so that Kumble could take the 10th. The performance was rated by Wisden as the second best "Bowling performance of all time". The achievement was commemorated by naming a traffic circle in Bengaluru after him, and gifting him a car with the customized license plate: KA-10-N-10. In 1999 he was the third highest wicket taker with 88 wickets at the average of 30.03 behind Glenn Mcgrath and Shane Warne.

When the Indian opener, Sadagoppan Ramesh tried to take a catch off Srinath, he was cautioned by Javagal Srinath not to try and take any catch so that Anil Kumble could take all 10 Wickets. This was revealed by Ramesh in an interview via 10 Sports; about the particular match "Anil Kumble’s 10 wickets against Pakistan at Feroz Shah Kotla, New Delhi in 1999". When Kumble was looking to take his tenth wicket in the India-Pakistan test in 1999, Srinath, who was bowling from the other end, was trying to bowl way outside the off-stump to avoid taking the final wicket in order for Kumble to get to the record. Anil Kumble always gives full credit to him for his perfect 10 against Pakistan as Srinath bowled two wide balls in test match to avoid taking a wicket.

On 6 October 2004, Kumble became only the third spinner in the history of Test cricket after Shane Warne and Muttiah Muralitharan and the second Indian bowler after Kapil Dev to capture 400 Test wickets. Reaching the mark took him 30 fewer Test matches than it took Kapil Dev, and 7 fewer than Warne. In the India-West Indies series of 2006, Kumble took 6–78 in the second innings of the final Test in Sabina Park, Jamaica, and bowled India to a historic series win; it had been 35 years since a similar series victory. During the first innings of the match, Kumble scored 45 and became the second player in the history of the game after Shane Warne to score 2000 runs and take over 500 Test wickets. Kumble also holds the world record for trapping most batsmen leg before wicket. On 10 December 2004, Kumble became India's highest wicket-taker when he trapped Mohammad Rafique of Bangladesh to surpass Kapil Dev's haul of 434 wickets.

Kumble also played for ACC Asian XI against ICC World XI in World cricket tsunami appeal ODI match on 10 January 2005 held at the Melbourne cricket ground which was organised for the charity purpose for 2004 Indian Ocean earthquake and tsunami victims. In the match, he picked up 2/73 and scored 11 runs off 7 balls. For his performances in 2005, he was named as 12th man in the Test World Test XI by ICC.

Kumble claimed his 500th Test wicket in the Second Test of England's tour of India in March 2006, when he dismissed Steve Harmison lbw. He became the first Indian and fifth overall to reach the mark. After returning to India from the 2007 World Cup, he announced his retirement from ODIs, on 30 March.

On 10 August that year, Kumble scored his maiden Test century, making an unbeaten 110 against England at the Oval to help his team finish with 664. He took 118 Tests to reach his maiden Test hundred, which is a record for taking the most matches to score a century, beating Chaminda Vaas who had held this record previously with 96 Tests. It was also the only hundred by an Indian in the three-Test series. He is the only Test cricketer to have taken all ten wickets in an innings and score a Test hundred in his career. A day after scoring his ton, Kumble dismissed Vaughan for his 900th International wicket and 563rd Test wicket, drawing him level with McGrath. Later he trapped Monty Panesar for an lbw to finish the innings and overtake McGrath in the list of all-time wicket-takers, only Muttiah Muralitharan and Shane Warne have more wickets.

Kumble has bowled 40850 balls in his entire Test career, which is second highest after M Muralitharan's 44039 balls.

Kumble was appointed as the captain of the Indian Test cricket team on 8 November 2007. He succeeded his state teammate Rahul Dravid, who resigned as the captain in September 2007. He is the only leg spinner who have become the captain of the team. His first series as captain of Indian Test team was a three-match series against Pakistan played in India. which the team won by 1–0.

On 17 January 2008, in the third Test against Australia at WACA, Perth, Anil Kumble became the first Indian bowler and the third in the world to reach the milestone of 600 Test wickets. Kumble achieved the record just after the tea break when he had Andrew Symonds caught by Rahul Dravid at first slip. Kumble's 600 wickets came in 124 matches at an average of 28.68. Kumble has captured most wickets against Australia by an Indian bowler. Kumble is the third bowler after Muttiah Muralitharan and Shane Warne to take 600 Test wickets.

Retirement from International cricket
Kumble injured the little finger of his left hand while attempting a catch off Matthew Hayden in Australia's first innings which rendered him unfit for the 4th and final test of the series against Australia in November 2008. Kumble was finding it difficult to find his striking form and went wicketless in four consecutive innings before the first innings of Australia in the third test of the series against Australia in which he managed three lower-order wickets. He declared the 2nd innings of India with only 6 overs of play left in the drawn match. His final figures were 4–0–14–0.

Anil Kumble announced his retirement from International test cricket, first-class cricket, and list A cricket appearances on 2 November 2008 in the 3rd Test match against Australia at Feroz Shah Kotla cricket stadium at New Delhi, India. He took the last wicket of his career of Mitchell Johnson. The final ball of his test career was a low full toss on which Matthew Hayden scored a four. After his retirement, M S Dhoni was made the captain of the team.

IPL career
Kumble agreed to honour his contract with the Royal Challengers Bangalore (RCB) franchise of the Indian Premier League after retirement. He was given a three-year contract worth US$500,000 per year in the first round of bidding in 2008.

On 18 April 2009 he took a five-wicket haul conceding just 5 runs in 3.1 overs against the defending champions Rajasthan Royals, which helped RCB get a 75-run victory in the second match of the 2009 edition, played in South Africa. Even today, this remains the fourth-best bowling figures in IPL history. After the departure of Kevin Pietersen for England's cricket commitments, Kumble was named as the captain of the Royal Challengers. On 23 May 2009, his team defeated the Chennai Super Kings by six wickets and got a spot in the final against the Deccan Chargers. RCB lost the finals but Kumble won Man of the Match, and is the only person in IPL history to win Man of the Match in the finals despite being on the losing side. Though RCB could not win the tournament, Kumble ended as the most successful spin bowler and the 2nd highest wicket-taker of the tournament with 21 wickets at an economy rate of 5.86 runs per over behind R. P. Singh.

In 2010 Indian Premier League, Kumble led the team to the semi-finals. After being forced to play their semi-finals at the DY Patil Stadium following security concerns in Bangalore, the Royal Challengers lost their semi-final to the Mumbai Indians with Kumble taking 1 wicket at an economy rate of 7.50 in the match. For his performances in 2010, he was named in the ESPN Cricinfo IPL XI.

Kumble announced his retirement from Indian Premier League on 4 January 2011. After his retirement from IPL as a player, RCB appointed him as the chief mentor for the team, where he led them to the 2011 Finals against the Chennai Super Kings. Kumble left that position in January 2013, moving to a similar role with the Mumbai Indians, which he quit in November 2015 after delivering them 2 titles in alternative years. He is currently the Director of Operations for the Punjab Kings.

Style and technique

Kumble is a right-arm leg spinner (legbreak googly) with an unorthodox style, most famous for his flipper. and a right-hand batsman He started his career as a fast bowler, which gave him a useful faster delivery. His unique bowling style can be attributed to matting pitches in Bangalore which assist top-spin and over-spin.

Kumble was one of the 4 bowlers, alongside Richard Hadlee, Shane Warne and Muttiah Muralitharan (later Rangana Herath , James Anderson, Ravichandran Ashwin), and (then) the only Indian bowler ever, to have taken 5 wickets in a Test innings more than 30 times. He also holds the world record for the largest number of caught-and-bowled dismissals in tests, 35 – which forms 5.65% of his total wickets. He is also one of 4 Indian bowlers to have conceded over 250 runs in a Test match, although he took 12 wickets in that match. He is known for bowling tirelessly, having bowled 72 overs in a Test innings once. He is also remembered for his tenacity in bowling even when injured, especially after an incident in a match against West Indies where, despite having his broken jaw being heavily taped, he came back and took the wicket of Brian Lara.

Kumble relies more on accuracy, variations and bounce rather than spinning the ball. Sambit Bal, the editor of Cricinfo, wrote, "That he [Kumble] has been an unusual spinner has been said many times before. It has also been said, a trifle unfairly, that he is a unidimensional bowler. Palpably, he has lacked the turn of Warne and Murali, but his variety has been subtler, far more apparent to batsmen than to viewers. He has shown that not only turn and flight that can deceive the batsman but also the changes of length and pace. He has been a cultured practitioner of his unique craft and a master of nuances."

As a captain and coach, he is a firm supporter of DRS.

Involvement in cricket associations
Kumble has been appointed to the athlete's commission of the World Anti-Doping Agency (WADA), with his term starting on 1 January 2009.

On 21 November 2010, Kumble was elected as The President of the Karnataka State Cricket Association, with statemates and former India teammate Venkatesh Prasad elected as vice-president whereas his former teammate, Javagal Srinath got elected as Secretary.

On 12 October 2012, Kumble was appointed as the new Chairman of ICC Cricket Committee. Kumble has been retained as the chairman of the ICC Cricket Committee for another three years on 2 March 2019.

Coaching career
On 24 June 2016 he was appointed as the head coach of the Indian Cricket Team by BCCI for a period of one year but resigned due to untenable differences with the captain, Virat Kohli, as stated by him. Anil Kumble's term of one year ended after the 2017 ICC Champions Trophy. The chief of COA, Vinod Rai, announced on 12 June 2017 that Anil Kumble will continue as the coach of the India Cricket Team for the upcoming West Indies tour of India. After a recent defeat in ICC Champions Trophy Final 2017 against Pakistan, he stepped down as the head coach of the Indian Cricket Team on 20 June 2017 after a duration of less than 1 year.

Kumble's first series as a coach was against the West Indies in July where India played four Test matches, winning 2–0. 
Later India beat New Zealand 3–0 in the Test series, his second consecutive Test series win as a coach. 
India also defeated England 4–0 in the five-Test series in November–December and stretched their winning streak to three test series victory under Kumble as a coach. 
India's fourth Test series win came against Bangladesh. India went on to dominate on their home soil which marked as India's 19-match unbeaten record in Tests. 
During the four-match Test series against Australia in March; India lost the first match but made a sensational comeback, beating the Australians in two of the last three tests, drawing one match and winning the series 2–1. 
India also registered two one-day series wins under Kumble's tenure, as India defeated New Zealand in a five one-day match series 3–2, followed by a 2–1 win over England in a three-match series.

Twitter statement by Kumble on 20 June 2017 – "I am honoured by the confidence reposed in me by the CAC, in asking me to continue as Head Coach. The credit for the achievements of the last one year goes to the Captain, the entire team, coaching and support staff.
Post this intimation, I was informed for the first time yesterday by the BCCI that the Captain had reservations with my 'style' and about my continuing as the Head Coach. I was surprised since I have always respected the role boundaries between Captain and Coach. Though the BCCI attempted to resolve the misunderstandings between the Captain and me, it was apparent that the partnership was untenable, and I therefore believe it is best for me to move on.
Professionalism, discipline, commitment, honesty, complementary skills and diverse views are the key traits I bring to the table. These need to be valued for the partnership to be effective. I see the Coach's role akin to 'holding a mirror' to drive self-improvement in the team's interest.
In light of these 'reservations' I believe it is best I hand over this responsibility to whomever the CAC and BCCI deem fit.
Let me reiterate that it has been an absolute privilege to have served as Head Coach for the last one year. I thank the CAC, BCCI, CoA, and all concerned.
I also wish to thank the innumerable followers and fans of Indian cricket for their continued support. I will remain a well-wisher of the great cricketing tradition of my country forever."

In October 2019, he was appointed as the Head Coach and the Director of Cricket Operations for Kings XI Punjab.

Awards and honours
 Arjuna award, a sports award from the Government of India, in 1995
 One of the Wisden Cricketers of the Year, in 1996.
 Among the 16 cricketers shortlisted for the Wisden Indian Cricketer of the 20th Century, in 2002 (Kapil Dev won)
 Padma Shri, a civilian award from the Government of India, in 2005.
 A prominent intersection in M. G. Road, Bengaluru has been named after Anil Kumble.
 'Best breakthrough performance IPL 2009' for his five-for-five against Rajasthan Royals in IPL 2009.
 ICC Cricket Hall of Fame, a sports award from the ICC, in 2015.

Records

Kumble is the most successful Indian bowler of all time and fourth-highest wicket-taker of all time in Tests. He took 35 five-wicket hauls and eight ten-wicket hauls in Tests and two ODI five-wicket hauls.

Kumble holds the record of bowling 40,850 balls in the entire Test career, which is the highest for an Indian and second-highest overall.

Kumble is also one of six bowlers to take 900 or more wickets in their entire career, taking 956 wickets in his career.

Filmography

Films

References

External links

 
 
 

Indian cricketers
India Test cricketers
India Test cricket captains
India One Day International cricketers
ACC Asian XI One Day International cricketers
Karnataka cricketers
South Zone cricketers
Leicestershire cricketers
Northamptonshire cricketers
Surrey cricketers
Wisden Cricketers of the Year
Recipients of the Arjuna Award
Cricketers at the 1996 Cricket World Cup
Cricketers at the 1999 Cricket World Cup
Cricketers at the 2003 Cricket World Cup
Cricketers at the 2007 Cricket World Cup
Recipients of the Padma Shri in sports
1970 births
Living people
Cricketers at the 1998 Commonwealth Games
Royal Challengers Bangalore cricketers
Kannada people
Cricketers who have taken ten wickets in an innings
Cricketers from Bangalore
Indian cricket coaches
Indian Premier League coaches
Indian cricket commentators
World Anti-Doping Agency members
Coaches of the Indian national cricket team
Commonwealth Games competitors for India
Cricketers who have acted in films